In organosilicon chemistry, organosilanols are a group of chemical compounds derived from silicon. More specifically, they are carbosilanes derived with a hydroxy group on the silicon atom. Organosilanols are the silicon analogs to alcohols. Silanols are more acidic and more basic than their alcohol counterparts and therefore show a rich structural chemistry characterized by hydrogen bonding networks which are particularly well studied for silanetriols.

Preparation 
Organosilanols can be obtained by hydrolysis of organohalosilanes, such as chlorotrimethylsilane. They can also be prepared by the oxidation of organosilanes with oxidizing agents (R = organic residue):
R2SiCl2{} + 2 HgO ->[-80^{\circ}C][toluene] R2Si(OH)2{} + 2 Hg^0

or by hydrolysis in the alkaline:

(H3C)3SiCl + H2O -> (H3C)3SiOH + HCl
R3SiH + H2O -> R3SiOH + H2

The hydrolysis of silyl ethers generally proceeds only slowly:
(H5C2)3SiOC2H5 + H2O -> (H5C2)3SiOH + HOC2H5

Hydrolysis of organosilanes is a first-order reaction. The hydrolysis rate of the Si-H bond depends on the type and number of organic residues. Thus, the hydrolysis rate of trialkylsilanes is significantly slower than that of triarylsilanes. This can be explained by a stronger increase in electron density on the silicon atom by the alkyl groups. Correspondingly, the reaction rate of the tri-n-alkylsilanes decreases in the series of ethyl, propyl, butyl groups. Trialkylsilanes with n-alkyl residues react by a factor of 10 faster than the analogous silanes with branched alkyl residues.

Classification 
Depending on the substitution pattern of the silicon atom, a further distinction can be made. Organosilanols are classified as:
 organosilanetriols, when three hydroxy groups and an organic residue are bound to a silicon atom, e. g. methylsilanetriol, phenylsilanetriol
 organosilandiols, when two hydroxy groups and two organic residues are bound to a silicon atom, e. g. dimethylsilanediol, diphenylsilanediol
 organosilanols, when one hydroxy group and three organic residues are bound to a silicon atom, e. g. trimethylsilanol, triethylsilanol or triphenylsilanol.

References 

Organosilicon compounds